(English: The Life of Saint Meriasek) is a Cornish play completed in 1504. Its subject is the legends of the life of Saint Meriasek or Meriadoc, patron saint of Camborne, whose veneration was popular in Cornwall, Brittany, and elsewhere.

It is now held in the Peniarth Collection at the National Library of Wales.

Outline
The legend of Meriasek, son of a Duke of Brittany, who, for love of the priestly profession, refused marriage with a wealthy princess and led the life of a miracle-working hermit, first in Cornwall and afterwards in his native land; the legend of Saint Sylvester, who healed the emperor Constantine the Great of leprosy by a dip in the baptismal font, and then aided him in establishing Christianity throughout his broad dominion; and the curious legend of a mother who, on the Virgin's continued disregard of her prayer for the deliverance of a son in captivity, carried off the Christ Child from the arms of the Virgin's statue, and refused to yield up the baby to the Madonna until her own son was restored to her.

See also

Ordinalia

References

Further reading
 Doble, G. H. (1960) The Saints of Cornwall; part 1: Saints of the Land's End district. Truro: Dean & Chapter; pp. 111-45
 Koch, John T. Celtic Culture. ; p. 205

1504 plays
British plays
Christian plays
Christian hagiography
Cultural depictions of Constantine the Great
Cornish culture
Cornish folklore
English plays
Medieval drama
16th-century literature
Middle Cornish literature
Plays set in the 4th century
Plays set in ancient Rome
Plays set in England
Plays set in France
Religious vernacular drama
Peniarth collection